Omorgus insignicollis is a species of hide beetle in the subfamily Omorginae.

References

insignicollis
Beetles described in 1896